The château de Carros is located at the top of the ancient village of Carros, in the département of Alpes-Maritimes, région of Provence-Alpes-Côte d'Azur, France.

History 
The Chateau dates from the late 13th century, when it was in the possession of the House of Blacas  .

See also 
List of castles in France

Notes and references

External links 
 Site of CIAC

Châteaux in Provence-Alpes-Côte d'Azur
Châteaux in Alpes-Maritimes